Zhang Li (Chinese: 张礼; born 28 February 1989) is a Chinese football player who currently plays for China League Two side Jiangxi Liansheng.

Club career
In 2007, Zhang Li started his professional footballer career with Chongqing Lifan in the China League One.  On 2 May 2009, he made his debut for Chongqing in the 2009 Chinese Super League against Hangzhou Greentown.
In March 2011, Zhang moved to Chinese Super League side Chengdu Blades on a one-year loan deal.

In 2014, Zhang transferred to China League Two side Jiangxi Liansheng.

Club career statistics 
Statistics accurate as of match played 1 November 2015.

References

1989 births
Living people
Chinese footballers
Footballers from Shenyang
Chengdu Tiancheng F.C. players
Chongqing Liangjiang Athletic F.C. players
Jiangxi Beidamen F.C. players
Chinese Super League players
China League One players
Association football midfielders